Bagh-e Asiya (also Romanized as Bāgh-e Āsīyā) is a village in Howmeh Rural District, in the Central District of Gonabad County, Razavi Khorasan Province, Iran. At the 2006 census, its population was 1,690, in 451 families.

See also 

 List of cities, towns and villages in Razavi Khorasan Province

References 

Populated places in Gonabad County